Creston is a village in Ogle County, Illinois, United States. The population was 627 at the 2020 census, down from 662 in 2010.

History
Creston was named for its supposed location on the highest point of land between Chicago and the Mississippi River.

Geography

Creston is located at  (41.930816, -88.965554).

Demographics

As of the census of 2000, there were 543 people, 195 households, and 154 families residing in the village. The racial makeup of the village was 95.58% White, 1.10% African American, 0.37% Asian, 1.10% from other races, and 1.84% from two or more races. Hispanic or Latino of any race were 5.34% of the population.

There were 195 households, out of which 37.9% had children under the age of 18 living with them, 64.6% were married couples living together, 10.8% had a female householder with no husband present, and 21.0% were non-families. 19.0% of all households were made up of individuals, and 7.2% had someone living alone who was 65 years of age or older. The average household size was 2.78 and the average family size was 3.18.

In the village, the population was spread out, with 29.8% under the age of 18, 6.4% from 18 to 24, 30.9% from 25 to 44, 21.9% from 45 to 64, and 10.9% who were 65 years of age or older. The median age was 34 years. For every 100 females, there were 96.7 males. For every 100 females age 18 and over, there were 94.4 males.

The median income for a household in the village was $40,000, and the median income for a family was $44,688. Males had a median income of $32,321 versus $23,125 for females. The per capita income for the village was $18,927. About 5.1% of families and 5.2% of the population were below the poverty line, including 6.5% of those under age of 18 and 2.9% of those 65 and over.

Notable person

 Knute Hill, congressman from Washington, born in Creston

References

External links

Village of Creston, Illinois
Creston Elementary School

Villages in Ogle County, Illinois
Villages in Illinois